Fengcheng Subdistrict is a Subdistrict in Changshou District, Chongqing, People's Republic of China.

Administrative division
The subdistrict is divided into 14 villages and 10 communities:
Taohua Community
Qi'an Community
Xiangyanglu Community
Fengling Community
Wangjianglu Community
Sanxialu Community
Qinghualu Community
Binjianglu Community
Dongjie Community
Fuyuan Village
Yongfeng Village
Changfeng Village
Zouma Village
Dongxin Village
Honghua Village
anghe Village
ongbai Village
Huangjin Village
Sandong Village
Lingyuan Village
Guotan Village
Gufo Village
Baimiao Village

External links

Divisions of Changshou District